Azerbaijan competed at the 2022 World Games held in Birmingham, United States from 7 to 17 July 2022. Athletes representing Azerbaijan won one gold medal and one bronze medal. The country finished in 45th place in the medal table.

Medalists

Competitors
The following is the list of number of competitors participating in the Games:

Gymnastics

Aerobic

Azerbaijan won one bronze medal in aerobic gymnastics.

Rhythmic

Azerbaijan competed in rhythmic gymnastics.

Karate

Azerbaijan competed in karate.

Men

Women

Kickboxing

Azerbaijan won one gold medal in kickboxing.

References

External links 
Amerika Birləşmiş Ştatlarının Birmingem şəhərində keçirilən XI Dünya Oyunlarında ən yüksək nəticələr göstərmiş Azərbaycan Respublikasının idmançıları və onların məşqçilərinin mükafatlandırılması haqqında Azərbaycan Respublikası Prezidentinin Sərəncamı. president.az, 08.08.2022

Nations at the 2022 World Games
2022
World Games